Barbara Rinke (born 8 January 1947) is a German politician of the Social Democratic Party. She was born in Nordhausen, Thuringia, and was Bürgermeister of that city from 1994 to 2012.  From 2003 to 2009, she was the praeses of the synod of the Evangelical Church in Germany (EKD).

Honors 
 2005:  Order of Merit of the Federal Republic of Germany (Officer's Cross, or Merit Cross 1st Class)

References

External links 

1947 births
Women mayors of places in Germany
Mayors of places in Thuringia
People from Nordhausen, Thuringia
German Protestants
Officers Crosses of the Order of Merit of the Federal Republic of Germany
Social Democratic Party of Germany politicians
Living people
20th-century German women politicians
21st-century German women politicians